Michael Walker (born 1984) is a New Zealand born former jockey of Māori ancestry who won the New Zealand premiership and also competed in Australia, Hong Kong and Singapore.

Early life
Michael Walker was born in Rotorua, New Zealand in the central districts of the North Island, although his family later moved to Waitara. At the age of 11 Walker approached noted Thoroughbred trainer Allan Sharrock, asking for work with his horses. Sharrock gave him regular work after school, before eventually indenturing him as an apprentice. He arranged a special dispensation for Walker to start riding in races at age 15 instead of the usual starting age of 16.

In his first year as an apprentice (the 1999–2000 racing year), Walker had an astonishing 131 wins to not only win the apprentices’ championship but the jockeys’ premiership as well (his first of three). While apprenticed to Sharrock, Walker won 653 races, most in New Zealand (a record 631 wins), but also in Australia, Hong Kong, Malaysia, Japan, Singapore and Macau.

Senior jockey
Still only 20 when he became a fully fledged jockey in April 2004, Walker celebrated the next day by riding five winners at the Woodville-Pahiatua Racing Club's meeting in southern Hawke's Bay. Despite not riding in New Zealand for three-quarters of the season, Walker finished with 107 wins, only seven behind Matamata jockey Leith Innes who won the 2003–04 premiership. However, he was awarded the apprentice of the year title for the season.

Overseas move
Wanting to further his career, Walker announced in May 2004 that he was moving to Australia to live in Melbourne, following in the footsteps of other champion New Zealand jockeys, such as Midge Didham, Greg Childs, Brent Thomson, Shane Dye and the Cassidy brothers, who made their names overseas.

Walker left with the blessing of Sharrock and the New Zealand racing fraternity. He made an immediate impression a few days after moving to Victoria, when he rode 30-1 shot Monde Special to win the Warrnambool Cup. A couple of weeks later he rode Chloe With Class to win at Moonee Valley to record his first metropolitan win, and followed that with a treble at Bendigo on 20 May 2004 on Lord Orb, Swift Rule, and Scopari.

His ride on Danestorm to win the Brisbane Cup in June 2004 was hailed by the media. However, he then went through a period of poor form and wins were few and far between. 

In 2005 Michael returned to New Zealand and became stable rider for leading Matamata trainer Mark Walker. With that deal the winning feeling returned and in March 2006 he producing a perfectly timed ride on Pentane to win New Zealand's richest handicap, the Auckland Cup.

Hunting accident
On 20 May 2008 Walker was seriously injured while pig hunting in Taranaki when he fell down a 10-metre high bank. He was taken to Taranaki Base Hospital and then transferred to Auckland City Hospital with serious head injuries. He scored a win in only his second ride after his accident, at Matamata on 4 December 2008.

Injury and retirement

In August 2022 Michael Walker suffered a fall at a jumpout trial meeting at Pakenham, Victoria, and was hospitalised in intensive care, placed in an induced coma to stabilise him. This fall left Walker him suffering from a brain injury and in February 2023 he retired from raceday riding.

At the time of his retirement it was reported Walker had won 1144 races in New Zealand and more than 2000 when including his victories in Australia, Hong Kong and Singapore. This included 25 Group I races.

Notable victories

The following are some of the major races Michael has won in New Zealand and Australia.

See also

 Thoroughbred racing in New Zealand
 Thoroughbred racing in Australia

References

New Zealand jockeys
Sportspeople from Rotorua
Living people
New Zealand Māori sportspeople
1984 births